George Roche (1889–1973) was an English footballer who played for Preston North End and Stoke.

Career
Rocahe was born in Birkenhead and played for Northern Nomads before joining Preston North End in 1909. He only played three matches for Preston before quitting to join the University of Liverpool and whilst studying played for the university football team. He joined Stoke in 1912 and made three appearances for the club in 1912–13. He returned to amateur football with Lancaster City.

Career statistics

References

1889 births
1973 deaths
People from Birkenhead
English footballers
Association football midfielders
Northern Nomads F.C. players
Preston North End F.C. players
Stoke City F.C. players
Lancaster City F.C. players
English Football League players
Southern Football League players